St David's Church, Exeter is a church in Exeter, Devon. It is a Grade I listed building.

History

There has been a church on this site since the late Anglo-Saxon period. The current building was designed by W. D. Caröe and completed in 1900. It was described by John Betjeman as "the finest example of Victorian church architecture in the south west". The previous church on the site was started in 1816 and was built in a Greek Doric style, but was demolished and rebuilt at the turn of the 20th century.

Organ

The first organ was installed in 1817 and was by William Thomas. This was later transferred to Sidmouth Methodist Church.

The current organ was installed in 1902 by Hele and Co. A specification of the organ can be found on the National Pipe Organ Register.

References

Further reading
Orme, Nicholas (2014) The Churches of Medieval Exeter, Impress Books, ISBN 9781907605512; pp. 95-96.

External links
 Official website

Exeter
Churches completed in 1900
Rebuilt churches in the United Kingdom
Exeter
Exeter
Churches in Exeter
Buildings by W. D. Caröe